The second Wael al-Halqi government was the fifth Syrian government formed during the presidency of Bashar al-Assad, with Wael Nader al-Halqi as Prime Minister. It was formed on 10 August 2014, after the 2014 Syrian presidential election, and lasted until 22 June 2016.

See also
Cabinet of Syria
Government ministries of Syria
List of prime ministers of Syria
List of foreign ministers of Syria

References 

2014 establishments in Syria
Bashar al-Assad
Cabinet of Syria
Government ministers of Syria
Lists of political office-holders in Syria
2016 disestablishments in Syria
Cabinets established in 2014
Cabinets disestablished in 2016